Dustin Hoffman is an American actor known for his performances on the stage and screen.

He started his film career in Mike Nichols' landmark film The Graduate (1967). He continued to star in films such as Midnight Cowboy (1969), Little Big Man (1971), Papillon (1973), Lenny (1974), All the President's Men (1976), Marathon Man (1976) and Tootsie (1982).

He has won two Academy Awards for his performances in Kramer vs. Kramer (1979), and Rain Man (1988). He received two Primetime Emmy Awards and a win for his performance in Death of a Salesman. He received a Tony Award nomination for Best Actor in a Play for his performance in The Merchant of Venice in 1990. He has received 14 Golden Globe Award nominations with six wins including one for the Cecil B. DeMille Lifetime Achievement Award in 1996. He has also received two Screen Actors Guild Award nominations. Hoffman received the AFI Life Achievement Award in 1999 and the Kennedy Center Honors Award in 2012.

Major associations

Academy Awards

Emmy Awards

Tony Awards

Industry Awards

British Academy Film Awards

Golden Globe Awards

Screen Actors Guild Award

Theatre awards

Drama Desk Awards

Miscellaneous awards

Annie Awards

References 

Lists of awards received by American actor